Shane William Cotton  (born 3 October 1964) is a New Zealand painter whose work explores biculturalism, colonialism, cultural identity, Māori spirituality, and life and death.

Life
Cotton was born in Upper Hutt with Ngāpuhi iwi affiliations (his father a member of the Ngāpuhi iwi and his mother European). Cotton studied at the Ilam School of Fine Arts in Christchurch, graduating in 1988 and then went on to gain a Diploma of Education from Christchurch College of Education. After finishing his studies he lectured at Massey University, Palmerston North, in the Māori visual arts programme until 2005 when he left to concentrate on his art practice full-time. He lives and works in Palmerston North.

Cotton was the recipient of the Frances Hodgkins Fellowship in 1998. In 2008, he received a Laureate Award from the New Zealand Arts Foundation. He was appointed an Officer of the New Zealand Order of Merit, for services to the visual arts, in the 2012 Queen's Birthday and Diamond Jubilee Honours. His work is highly sought after. He has received the Seppelt Contemporary Art Award from Sydney Museum of Contemporary Art, and has been exhibited at many leading galleries in Australia and New Zealand, as well as in Spain and Prague. He was the New Zealand representative in the 2005 Prague Biennale and his work was included in the 17th Biennale of Sydney 2010. In 2015 Cotton was commissioned by the Australian War Memorial to make a print to commemorate the ANZAC Centenary. His work has been translated into a stained glass installation in St Joseph's Church, Mt Victoria, Wellington.

Cotton's work includes Māori iconography and culture, such as shrunken heads, mokomokai, and native birds such as tūī, and European symbols and items. His paintings have explored questions of colonialism, cultural identity, Māori spirituality, and life and death. Describing his practice, Cotton says, "Biculturalism, how our histories have been interwoven over time, things that have come out of that connection – culture, politics, societal living – have been the driving factors in my work."

Awards 
 2012 Officer of the New Zealand Order of Merit, for services to the visual arts, in the 2012 Queen's Birthday and Diamond Jubilee Honours
 2008 Arts Foundation of New Zealand Laureate Award
 1999 Te Tohu Mahi Hou a Te Waka Toi/Te Waka Toi Award for New Work
 1998 Ethel Rose Overton Scholarship; Sawtell-Turner Prize in Painting; Irwin Allen Hunt Scholarship; Frances Hodgkins Fellowship University of Otago, Dunedin; Seppelt Contemporary Art Award for visual arts, Museum of contemporary Art, Sydney. 
 1991 Te Waka Toi Projects Grant
 1989 Wilkins and Davies Young Artist of the Year 
 1986 Bickerton-Widdowson Memorial Scholarship

Selected solo exhibitions 

 2014 Baseland, Christchurch City Gallery & Ilam Campus Gallery, Christchurch, The Voyage Out, Rossi & Rossi Gallery, Hong Kong
 2013 Shane Cotton: the Hanging Sky Campbelltown Arts Centre, NSW & City Gallery Wellington & Christchurch Art Gallery Te Puna o Waiwhetu
 2012 Shane Cotton: the Hanging Sky, IMA Brisbane; Smoking Gun, Anna Schwartz Gallery, Melbourne
 2011 Supersymmetry, Michael Lett Gallery, Auckland
 2010 Smashed Myth, Anna Schwartz Gallery, Sydney; New Work, Michael Lett Gallery, Auckland; To and Fro, Rossi & Rossi Gallery, London
 2008 Coloured Dirt, Hamish McKay Gallery, Wellington
 2007 Shane Cotton, Sherman Galleries, Sydney; Red-Shift, Sherman Galleries, Sydney; Helgoland, Brooke Gifford Gallery, Christchurch 
 2006 Shane Cotton, Hamish McKay Gallery, Wellington Shane Cotton, Gow Langsford Gallery, Auckland 
 2005	Pararaiha, Sherman Galleries, Sydney, New Zealand representative in the Prague Biennale
 2004	Shane Cotton Survey 1993–2003, Auckland Art Gallery Toi o Tamaki, Auckland 
 2003	Shane Cotton Survey 1993–2003, City Gallery Wellington; Shane Cotton: Recent Painting, Gow Langsford Gallery, Auckland; Shane Cotton: Paintings, SOFA Gallery, School of Fine Arts, University of Canterbury, Christchurch; Shane Cotton: New Paintings, Brooke-Gifford Gallery, Christchurch 
 2002	Powder Garden, Hamish McKay Gallery, Wellington; Birds Eyes Views, Mori Gallery, Sydney
 2001	Blackout Movement, Gow Langsford Gallery, Auckland; New Paintings, Brooke Gifford Gallery, Christchurch 
 2000	Te Timatanga: From Eden to Ohaeawai, Dunedin Public Art Gallery; Hamish McKay Gallery, Wellington 
 1999	New Painting, Brooke Gifford Gallery, Christchurch; Shane Cotton, Hocken Library Gallery, University of Otago, Dunedin New Paintings, Hamish McKay Gallery, Wellington & Mori Gallery, Sydney & Gow Langsford Gallery, Auckland 
 1998	Local, Hamish McKay Gallery, Wellington; Shane Cotton, Gow Langsford Gallery, Auckland 
 1997	New Painting, Brooke Gifford Gallery, Christchurch; Square Style, Mori Gallery, Sydney 
 1996	New Painting, Anna Bibby Gallery, Auckland; New Painting, Hamish McKay Gallery, Wellington 
 1995	Shane Cotton: Recent Paintings, Govett-Brewster Art Gallery, New Plymouth; Te Ta Pahara, Brooke Gifford Gallery, Christchurch; Shane Cotton: Recent Paintings, Darren Knight Gallery, Melbourne; Ta Te Whenua, Manawatu Art Gallery Palmerston North; Fisher Gallery, Auckland 
 1994	New Works, Claybrook Gallery, Auckland; New Painting, Hamish McKay Gallery, Wellington 
 1993	Collections: New Work by Shane Cotton, Hamish McKay Gallery, Wellington 
 1992	Strata, Brooke Gifford Gallery, Christchurch 
 1990	Nature Forms Myth, Last Decade Gallery, Wellington

References

Further reading
‘Shane Cotton’ The Arts Foundation. Retrieved 13 June 2015. 
‘Shane Cotton: The Hanging Sky’ City Gallery Wellington. Resource Card. Retrieved 13 June 2015. 
'Shane Cotton, The Hanging Sky' 2013. Michael Lett Gallery, Auckland. . Text by Eliot Weinberger, Justin Paton, Geraldine Kirrihi Barlow and Robert Leonard. 
‘Artist Profile, Shane Cotton’ Conceptioart. Retrieved 13 June 2015. 
‘Shane Cotton: Stamina, Surprise and Suspense’ Justin Paton, Christchurch Art Gallery Te Puna o Waiwhetu, 1 December 2012. Transcript of an interview with Shane Cotton. 
‘Story: Painting, Shane Cotton’ Te Ara. The Encyclopedia of New Zealand. Retrieved 13 June 2015. 
Daly-Peoples, John (20 July 2010). ‘Shane Cotton paintings examine the cultural landscape’. NBR Radio.
McAloon, William (1999). home and away. Contemporary Australian and New Zealand Art from the Chartwell Collection. Auckland Art Gallery Toi o Tāmaki. Pg. 62.
Strongman, Lara, ed. (2004). Shane Cotton. Victoria University Press.
Trevelyn, Jill. ‘Shane Cotton’. Retrieved 13 June 2015. 
Tyler, L., ed. (1998). Shane Cotton. Hocken Library, Dunedin.

External links
'Shane of Ngapuhi'
Artworks at the Museum of New Zealand Te Papa Tongarewa
Auckland Art Gallery Toi o Tāmaki: Works by Shane Cotton
Cotton at the City Gallery Wellington
Shane Cotton Victoria University of Wellington Press, 2004
‘Shane Cotton Survey 1993–2003’ Auckland Art Gallery Toi o Tāmaki. Exhibition dates 29 May 2004 – 8 August 2004. 
‘Shane Cotton: Baseland’ Christchurch Art Gallery Te Puna o Waiwhetu. Exhibition dates 7 June 2014 – 17 August 2014.

1964 births
Living people
Academic staff of the Massey University
Modern painters
New Zealand painters
Ilam School of Fine Arts alumni
Officers of the New Zealand Order of Merit
Ngāpuhi people
New Zealand Māori artists